Prakanta Warisa is an Indian politician. He was a Member of Parliament, representing Assam in the Rajya Sabha, the upper house of India's Parliament as a member of the Autonomous State Demand Committee.

References

Rajya Sabha members from Assam
1965 births
Living people